The following is a list of shopping malls in Poland.

Poland
Shopping malls